Ziherl is a surname. Notable people with the surname include:

 (1910–1976), Slovene philosopher, politician, and political commissar
Branko Ziherl (1916–1942), Slovenian diver
Slavko Ziherl (1945–2012), Slovenian psychiatrist

See also
Martin v. Ziherl